Rita E. "Betty" Paraskevas (April 8, 1929 – April 7, 2010) was a New York-based writer and lyricist best known for her work on Maggie and the Ferocious Beast, but adapted into a animated television series and produced by the Canadian studio Nelvana.

Early life, career and death
Born in New Jersey, prior to becoming a children's author, Paraskevas worked for many years as a playwright and lyricist on Broadway, working with producer Harry Rigby on shows such as Sugar Babies and No, No, Nanette.

Betty Paraskevas moved to Southampton in the mid-1980s. Her collaborations with her son, Michael Paraskevas, began in the early 1990s when Michael – already a successful illustrator – encouraged her to write a story which he could then illustrate. They produced On the Edge of the Sea, which was published by Dial Books in 1992. Their second book, which she once again penned, was Junior Kroll. Published in 1993, it led to their first series. Since then the pair produced over 20 books, three of which were turned into television series and aired on networks such as Nickelodeon.

Betty Paraskevas died on April 7, 2010, from complications due to pancreatic cancer; in Southampton, New York, one day before her 81st birthday.

Bibliography 
 With Michael Paraskevas, unless otherwise noted
On the Edge of the Sea (Dial Books, 1992)
Junior Kroll (HMH Books for Young Readers, 1993)
Shamlanders (Harcourt Childrens Books, 1993)
The Strawberry Dog (Dial Books, 1993)
Junior Kroll and Company (Harcourt Brace & Company, 1994)
A Very Kroll Christmas (Harcourt Childrens Books, 1994)
Gracie Graves and the Kids from Room 402 (Harcourt Childrens Books, 1995) — adapted into The Kids from Room 402
Cecil Bunions and the Midnight Train (Harcourt Childrens Books, 1996)
The Ferocious Beast with the Polka-Dot Hide (Harcourt Childrens Books, 1996) — adapted into Maggie and the Ferocious Beast
The Tangerine Bear (Harpercollins Childrens Books, 1997) — adapted into The Tangerine Bear
Hoppy and Joe (Simon & Schuster Children's Publishing, 1999)
Maggie and the Ferocious Beast: The Big Scare (Simon & Schuster Children's Publishing, 1999)
The Big Carrot: A Maggie and the Ferocious Beast Book (Simon & Schuster Children's Publishing, 2000)
On the Day the Tall Ships Sailed (Simon & Schuster Children's Publishing, 2000)
Nibbles O'Hare (Simon & Schuster Children's Publishing, 2001)
Marvin the Tap-Dancing Horse (Simon & Schuster Children's Publishing, 2001) — adapted into Marvin the Tap-Dancing Horse
The Green Monkeys (Paraskevas Gallery, 2002)

References

1929 births
2010 deaths
Deaths from pancreatic cancer
American children's writers
American lyricists